Palmettaspis is an extinct genus of trilobite in the order Olenellida. There are at least two described species in Palmettaspis.

Species
These two species belong to the genus Palmettaspis:
 † Palmettaspis consorta Fritz
 † Palmettaspis parallela Fritz

References

Trilobites
Articles created by Qbugbot